Ceerial Port is an EP by the electronic artist Ceephax Acid Crew. It was released in 2006.

Track listing
"Acid Highway" - 1:26
"Red DX Acid" - 5:03
"Acid Whorl" - 3:22
"Acid Causeway" - 5:28
"Tough Grugoy Acid" - 3:35
"Acid Surf Dream" - 7:39
"Woodlice Acid" - 4:32

External links
 Ceephex Acid Crew on Lastfm.com

Ceephax Acid Crew albums
2006 EPs
Rephlex Records EPs